Bruno Spaggiari (born 11 January 1933 in Reggio Emilia) is an Italian former Grand Prix motorcycle road racer. His best year was in 1960 when he finished fourth in the 125cc world championship. Spaggiari won the first Grand Prix he entered at the 1958 125cc Nations Grand Prix held at Monza, but he was never able to win another race.

He appeared briefly as a character in the 2020 film Rose Island, portrayed by Marco Pancrazi.

References

1933 births
Sportspeople from Reggio Emilia
Italian motorcycle racers
125cc World Championship riders
350cc World Championship riders
500cc World Championship riders
Living people